Séamus P. Ó Mórdha (8 October 1915 – 12 February 2005) was an Irish teacher and historian.

A native of Scotshouse, County Monaghan and professor of Irish at St. Patrick's College in Drumcondra, Dublin from 1954 to 1981, Ó Mórdha contributed to Celtica, Éigse, Studies, Studia Hibernica, Seanchas Ardmhacha, and Breifne. His published work included studies of poets such as Fiachra Mac Brádaigh, Art Mac Bionaid, and Muiris Ó Gormáin. The Irish Times praised him as a "renowned scholar who promoted Irish education, language and culture. ... His tenure coincided with a period of great change in education that saw the introduction of the new curriculum and the restructuring of teacher training. When St Patrick’s College was granted university status in 1974 he ensured that the Irish department rose to the challenge by offering courses on a par with any third-level institute."

References

External links
 http://www.ainm.ie/Bio.aspx?ID=1923
 Aistí ag iompar scéil: in ómós do Shéamus P. Ó Mórdha, ed. Breandán Ó Conaire, 2004
 "Maurice O'Gorman in Monaghan", in Clogher Record, Vol. 2, No. 1 (1957), pp. 20-24

1915 births
2005 deaths
People from County Cavan
Irish editors
Irish educators
Irish folklorists
Irish-language writers
Academics of Dublin City University